The Leader of Fianna Fáil is the most senior politician within the Fianna Fáil political party in Ireland. Since 26 January 2011, the office has been held by Micheál Martin, following the resignation of Taoiseach Brian Cowen as leader of the party.

Background

The post of Leader of Fianna Fáil was officially created in 1926 when Éamon de Valera founded the party. De Valera had previously been leader of Sinn Féin and took the Anti-Treaty side during the Civil War. The new party essentially became a home for dissatisfied Sinn Féin TDs who had become disillusioned with the party's abstentionist policy from Dáil Éireann and wanted to republicanise the Irish Free State from within.

Like other Irish political parties, most notably Fine Gael, the Leader of Fianna Fáil has the power to dismiss or appoint their Deputy and to dismiss or appoint parliamentary party members to front bench positions.

When Fianna Fáil is in opposition the leader usually acts as the Leader of the Opposition, and chairs the opposition front bench. Concordantly, when the party is in government, the leader would usually become Taoiseach, as well as appointing the cabinet.

All eight leaders of Fianna Fáil have served as head of government. Éamon de Valera became the first, when he was elected President of the Executive Council in 1932. He became Taoiseach with the adoption of the current Constitution in 1937. He remained as leader of Fianna Fáil until 1959, when he retired after serving twenty-one years as head of government and after leading the party to eight general election triumphs. Seán Lemass was the unanimous choice to succeed de Valera as leader of Fianna Fáil and Taoiseach that year. He served seven years in both roles before handing over to Jack Lynch in 1966, following the first leadership election in the history of the party. Lynch served as party leader for thirteen years until 1979, nine of which were spent as Taoiseach. His resignation sparked another leadership election, which saw Charles Haughey emerge as Taoiseach and leader of a deeply divided party. His thirteen-year period in charge saw many heaves against his leadership from within the party, with the final challenge hastening his resignation in 1992.

That year, three candidates expressed an interest in seeking the leadership; however, Albert Reynolds was the overwhelming favourite in the subsequent leadership election and was elected Taoiseach and party leader. After just over two years in office, Reynolds was forced to resign in 1994. His successor was Bertie Ahern who, after being the unopposed candidate for the position of leader, was forced into opposition. Ahern went on to become the most popular leader of Fianna Fáil in the modern era, guiding the party to three successive election triumphs and serving almost eleven consecutive years as Taoiseach. His resignation in 2008 saw Brian Cowen take on the dual roles of Taoiseach and party leader, following an unopposed election. Cowen's tenure was characterised by a downturn in the economy, and he was effectively forced to resign as party leader in 2011 while remaining as Taoiseach. Four candidates put their names forward in the subsequent leadership election, with former Foreign Minister Micheál Martin becoming the eighth leader of the party.

Micheál Martin first served as Leader of the Opposition from 2011 until 2020. He led the party into two elections before being elected Taoiseach of a three party coalition government between Fianna Fáil, Fine Gael and the Green Party following the 2020 general election where no party won an outright majority. He served as Taoiseach until 17 December 2022, where the positions of Taoiseach and Tánaiste rotated as part of an agreed cabinet reshuffle where he became Tánaiste while Leo Varadkar, leader of Fine Gael, succeeded him as Taoiseach.

Leaders

Deputy leaders
The Deputy leader of Fianna Fáil is usually a senior politician within Fianna Fáil.

Like other political party leaders, the leader of Fianna Fáil has the power to appoint or dismiss their deputy. The position is not an elected one and is largely honorific.

The office of Tánaiste has been held by senior politicians in the main governing party. Previous Fianna Fáil Deputy leaders, including Brian Cowen and Mary Coughlan, held this post from 2007 to 2011. However, the Deputy leader is essentially a party official and there is no constitutional link between the two roles.

Fianna Fáil did not have a Deputy Leader from the reshuffle in 2012 until the reshuffle in 2018. Following the resignation of Dara Calleary in August 2020, the position of Deputy Leader is once again vacant.

See also
History of Fianna Fáil
Leader of Fine Gael
Leader of the Labour Party (Ireland)
Leader of Sinn Féin

References

Fianna Fáil
 
Fianna Fail
Republic of Ireland politics-related lists